The Toyota TF109 was a Formula One racing car engineered by Toyota for the 2009 Formula One season. The chassis was designed by Pascal Vasselon, Mark Tatham and Mark Gillan with the engine being designed by Luca Marmorini and Noritoshi Arai overseeing the entire project. It was revealed online on Toyota's website on 15 January 2009 and made its track debut on 18 January at the Autódromo Algarve. This was the last Formula One car to be developed by Toyota, as after the 2009 Formula One season was completed Toyota Motor Corporation announced their decision to withdraw from Formula One. As far as performance went, the car was extraordinarily inconsistent. It started the season well with three podium finishes in the first four races as it got the jump on rival teams with the "double-decker" diffuser. In the span of only two races however, the TF109 went from locking out the front row in Bahrain to locking out the back row in Monaco. The car from then on was uncompetitive despite a few glimmers of hope in Singapore when Timo Glock finished 2nd and Japan when Jarno Trulli also finished second.
The TF109 was the last F1 car to run on Esso fuel along with the Williams FW31 until the McLaren MP4-30 in the 2015 FIA Formula One World Championship, as well as last non-British based F1 car to run on Esso until Toro Rosso STR12 in the 2017 season.

Pre-season 
Three teams appealed against the decision, and after much deliberating the cars were again deemed to "comply with the applicable regulations" by the FIA.

Australian GP
Following the qualifying sessions, stewards deemed the rear wing of the TF109 to be flexible beyond what is allowed by the 2009 regulations. Both cars were therefore excluded from the qualifying classifications and started the race from the pitlane, fitted with replacement wings. Both cars completed the race, Trulli and Glock crossing the line in third and fifth respectively, however Trulli was given a 25-second penalty for passing Lewis Hamilton during the final safety car period, dropping him to 12th. After further investigation it was discovered that Lewis Hamilton had purposely let Trulli through. The penalty given to Trulli was removed and Hamilton subsequently disqualified from the Australian GP. Hamilton's removal was based upon misinformation given by the McLaren team during an initial investigation.

Jarno Trulli
Jarno Trulli started the season perfectly with third place before a strong finish in Malaysia. China saw difficulties for Jarno, though, after Robert Kubica clashed with him. Trulli was on pole position for the 2009 Bahrain Grand Prix but could only manage third. From Spain through to Singapore, Jarno and Toyota saw mixed results, some difficult like in Spain where he crashed out on lap 1. In Japan he returned to the podium after getting ahead of Lewis Hamilton in the stops.

Timo Glock
Timo Glock's second season saw a fourth place and a third place to kick off his season. However, after leading in the first corner at Bahrain, Timo struggled in Europe before coming second place in Singapore behind Hamilton. In Japan he endured a terrible leg injury after crashing out during qualifying meaning he was out of action before the end of the season.

Kamui Kobayashi
Kamui Kobayashi spent the majority of 2009 in the GP2 Series and being Toyota test driver before getting to drive the car in Brazil. He gave quite an impression after sending Kazuki Nakajima out of the Brazil Grand Prix, in Abu Dhabi he scored his first F1 points in his second F1 race, fighting hard with Jenson Button and beating team mate Jarno Trulli in the race as well.

Later uses
The tyre manufacturer Pirelli used the TF109 chassis in 2010–2011 as a test car in tyre development. The Renault R30 replaced the TF109 as Pirelli's test car in 2012.

Complete Formula One results
(key) (results in bold indicate pole position; results in italics indicate fastest lap)

 Half points awarded as less than 75% of race distance completed.

Photos

References

External links

Toyota Formula One cars
2009 Formula One season cars